Károly Gesztesi (born Károly Tóth; 16 April 1963 – 4 January 2020) was a Hungarian actor. He was best known for providing the Hungarian dubbing of Shrek from the movie of the same name.

Life and career 
He graduated from the Academy of Drama and Film in Budapest and, until 1990, he was a member of the Thalia Theater company. He then travelled to Holland for a few months. He acted in multiple theatres throughout the 1990s, including the National Theatre of Miskolc, the Attila József Theatre, and the Comedy Theatre of Budapest. Since 1998, he was a freelance actor. He was also a member of a band. Gesztesi was best known as a Hungarian voice actor. He voiced the protagonist Shrek in the Hungarian dubs of the Shrek films. He was divorced and the father of five children. His eldest son is actor Máté Gesztesi.

On 4 January 2020, Gesztesi died from a heart attack in Budapest while in his car.

Theatre roles 
 Dezső Kosztolányi: Anna Édes – Kéményseprő
 György Szomor-Miklós Szurdi-Atilla Valla: Diótörő és Egérkirály – Egérkiràly
 Elton John – Tim Rice: Aida – Zoser
 Bram Stoker: Dracula – Lelkész
 Shakespeare: Othello – Othello
 April De Angelis: Garrick – Macklin
 Shakespeare: Richard III – Richard
 Tim Rice – Andrew Lloyd Webber
 László Dés – Péter Geszti: A dzsungel könyve: Balu
 Ray Cooney – John Chapman: Kölcsönlakás....Henry Lodge
 Neil Simon – Marvin Hamlisch – C.B. Singer – Tibor Miklós: Mámor
 Woody Allen: New York- comedian
 Henrik Ibsen: Peer Gynt
 Arthur Miller: Marco
 Ben Elton: Popcorn Bruce Delamitri, film rendition
 Arthur Miller: Danforth
 Martin McDonagh: Valene Connor
 Daniel Keyes: Virágot Algernonnak

Filmography

Dubbing roles

Film dub roles

Awards 
 Miskolc város nívódíja (1990)
 Filmszemle Legjobb Férfi Epizódalakítás Díja (1997)
 VOXCar-díj (2002)
 Lions-díj (2006)
 Story Ötcsillag-díj (2006, 2009)

References 

Sources
 Gesztesi Károly
 Magyar színházművészeti lexikon. Főszerk. Székely György. Budapest: Akadémiai. 1994. Online elérés

External links 
 

1963 births
2020 deaths
Hungarian male film actors
Hungarian male stage actors
Hungarian male television actors
Hungarian male voice actors
Male actors from Budapest
20th-century Hungarian male actors
21st-century Hungarian male actors